Bojary is a district of Białystok, Poland.

Bojary may also refer to the following villages:
Bojary, Podlaskie Voivodeship (north-east Poland)
Bojary, Lublin Voivodeship (east Poland)
Bojary, Masovian Voivodeship (east-central Poland)
Bojary, Pomeranian Voivodeship (north Poland)